Harry Wallis Kew   (1868–1948) was an amateur English zoologist.

Wallis Kew worked as a bank clerk in Kent and devoted his free time to the study of pseudoscorpions and molluscs. He is best remembered for his book entitled The dispersal of shells; an inquiry into the means of dispersal possessed by fresh-water and land Mollusc, which included a preface by Alfred Russel Wallace. In this work, Wallis Kew was tracking the phenomena that is now referred to as invasive species in relation to molluscs,  and in particular the zebra mussel.

Wallis Kew was the grandson of woodcarver, Thomas Wilkinson Wallis, and in 1884 founded the Louth Naturalists’, Antiquarian and Literary Society. He was a member of the Lincolnshire Naturalists' Union from 1910 and served as its president in 1927.

The gastropod Ameranella kewi (Dickerson, 1915) was named in his honour.

Works
1893 The dispersal of shells; an inquiry into the means of dispersal possessed by fresh-water and land Mollusc
1901 Lincolnshire Pseudoscorpions: With an Account of the Associations of Such Animals with Other Arthropods
1911 A Synopsis of the False-scorpions of Britain and Ireland
1912 On the Pairing of Pseudoscorpiones
1914 On the Nests of Pseudoscorpiones: With Historical Notes on the Spinning Organs and Observations on the Building and Spinning of the Nests
1932 Thomas Johnson, Botanist and Royalist, Etc.

References

External links
List of papers on pseudoscorpions

English zoologists
1868 births
1948 deaths
Fellows of the Zoological Society of London
Members of the Lincolnshire Naturalists' Union
People from Louth, Lincolnshire